Taylor Darling (born May 14, 1997), also known as ASMR Darling or simply Darling, is an American  ASMR creator, Twitch streamer and YouTuber known for making ASMR videos.

Career 
Taylor began her career on YouTube, at first recording ASMR videos on her phone. Shortly after hitting 50,000 subscribers about 1½ month after uploading her first video, she was featured in a gaming video by PewDiePie. At 2 months, close to 100,000 subscribers, Taylor stopped making new content and placed all her YouTube videos on private, mainly due to technical issues with new equipment and being overwhelmed by her popularity. After a month long break, she began making videos again, including the very popular ASMR 10 Triggers to Help You Sleep (35 million views as of August 2022).

In July 2017 she uploaded another popular video, ASMR 20 Triggers to Help You Sleep (38 million views as of August 2022). She was in August 2017 interviewed in a Shane Dawson video and shortly after she reached 1 million subscribers on YouTube. In February 2019, Wired UK estimated that she was earning $1,000 per day from advertising revenue on her YouTube channel. 

Taylor voice acted and was model for the character ASMR Sweetie in the VR game Fire Escape, released in April 2018. 

In June 2018 she began streaming on Twitch. In the beginning gaming most days a week with a weekly ASMR stream. As of 2022 she streams ASMR two times a week.

Taylor was featured in an episode of The Try Guys in February 2019. In summer 2019, she participated as one of five ASMR creators in Reese The Movie: A Movie About Reese, a 1½ hour long advertisement for Reese's Peanut Butter Cups, made in ASMR style. Same year she was in the ASMR panel at VidCon 2019 in Anaheim, California. In September 2019, Taylor was performing and discussing ASMR with Neil deGrasse Tyson and Kelly Clarkson in The Kelly Clarkson Show on NBC.

Personal life 
She has deliberately kept her last name private, choosing to go only by her first name Taylor to protect herself from stalking and doxxing. , she resides in Florida.

References

External links 
 
 Darlings channel on Twitch
 ASMR Darling on Spotify
 Darling on Instagram
  Leaked Photos

1997 births
Living people
Practitioners of autonomous sensory meridian response
American YouTubers
YouTube channels launched in 2016
People from Florida